The following outline is provided as an overview of and typical guide to drawing and drawings:

 Drawing – activity of making marks on a surface so as to create some images, form or shape.
 A drawing – product of that activity.

What types of things are drawing and drawings? 
 Drawing is a type of:
 Activity – something someone does
 Art – an art, one of the arts, is a creative endeavor or discipline.
 Visual art –
 Avocation –
 Vocation –
A drawing is a type of:
 Art –
 Work of art –
 Illustration dash;

Types of drawing and drawings

Story telling 
 Anime –
 Comics –
 Cartoons –
 Manga –

Non - story telling 
Academy figure –
 Caricature – pictorial representation of someone in which distinguishing features are exaggerated for comic effect.
 Fashion illustration –
 Figure drawing –
 Gesture drawing –
 Line art – images that consist of distinct straight and curved lines placed against a (usually plain) background, without gradations in shade (darkness) or hue (color).
 Portrait –
 Scratchboard –
 Silhouette –
 Silverpoint –
 Sketch –
 Courtroom sketch –
 Croquis –
 Doodle –
 Multi-Sketch –
 Study –
 Scribble –
 Stick figure –
 Technical drawing/technical illustration –
 Architectural drawing –
 Electrical drawing –
 Engineering drawing –
 Plumbing drawing –
 Structural drawing –
 Scientific illustration (in natural sciences, also referred to biologic, zoologic, or botanical illustration)
 Mechanical systems drawing–
 Working drawing–
 Archaeological illustration–

Drawing techniques 
 Automatic drawing –
 Blind contour drawing – this action is performed were the artist looks at the object and does not look at the canvas or sketch pad

 Contour drawing –
 Chiaroscuro –  using strong contrasts between light and dark to achieve a sense of volume in modeling three-dimensional objects such as the human body.
 Gesture Drawing - loose drawing or sketching with the wrists moving, to create a sense of naturalism of the line or shape, as opposed to geometric or mechanical drawing
Grisaille –
Hatching – consists of hatching, contour hatching, and double contour hatching
 Masking –
 Mass drawing –
 Screentone –
 Scribble –
 Stippling – using tiny dots that become closer to create darker values, and gradually further away to create lighter values
 Trois crayons – using three colors, typically black, white and sanguine chalks
 Drybrush –

Types of draughtsman 

Draughtsman or draftsman –
 Cartoonist –
 Drafter –

Drawing media and equipment 
A medium (plural: media) is a material used by an artist to create a work.

Common drawing types 
Pastel  –
 Oil pastel –
 Charcoal –
Colored pencil –
Conté –
Crayon –
Graphite –  can be pencils which are small or large sticks similar to charcoal
Marker –
Pen and Ink –
 India ink –
 Technical pen –
 Sanguine –
Pencil

Common bases for drawing 
Canvas –
Paper – most common base for drawing.
 Sketchbook –
 Tracing paper –
Plaster –
Metal –
Walls – typically for murals.
Wood –

Other drawing equipment 
 Compass –
 Eraser –
 Kneaded eraser –
 Drawing board –
 Fixative –
 French curve –
 Protractor –
 Ruler –
 Rolling ruler –
 Stencil –
 Stump –

Principles and elements of drawing 
 Composition –
 Elements of art – group of aspects of a work of art used in teaching and analysis, in combination with the principles of art. They are texture, form, line, color, value, and shape.
 Perspective – the principle of creating the illusion of 3-dimensionality on a 2-dimensional source such as paper. This is achieved by using one or more vanishing points (Line perspective), or making the atmosphere greyer, blurrier and smaller as it goes further back (Atmospheric perspective).
 Principles of art – set of guidelines of art to be considered concerning the impact of a piece of artwork, in combination with the elements of art. They are movement, unity, harmony, variety, balance, emphasis, contrast, proportion, and pattern.

Drawing education 
 Atelier –
 Art school –
 Life class – Observational drawing from a real life model, usually a nude model.
Magnet Art school programs -

Awards 
 Payout Jerwood Drawing Prize –

Organizations 
 Association of American Editorial Cartoonists
 Cartoonists Rights Network, International
 Centre for Recent Drawing
 Drawing Center
 National Cartoonists Society
 Royal Drawing Society
 Seattle Cartoonists' Club

History of drawing 
 Lineography –
 Plumbago drawing –

Some notable draftsmen and drawings 

 Leonardo da Vinci (1452–1519) – Focus' on human anatomy and life forms. 
 Vitruvian Man (c. 1487) –
 Albrecht Dürer (1471–1528) –
 Betende Hände ("Praying Hands", c. 1508) –
 Michelangelo (1475–1564) –
 Epifania –
 Hans Holbein the Younger (c. 1498 – 1543) –
 
 Peter Paul Rubens (1577–1640) –
 Isabella Brant (c. 1621) –
 Jean de Beaugrand (1584–1640) –

 Aubrey Beardsley –
 Jacques-Louis David –
 Pierre-Paul Prud'hon –
 Edgar Degas –
 Théodore Géricault –
 Francisco Goya –
 Jean Ingres –
 Odilon Redon –
 Henri de Toulouse-Lautrec –
 Honoré Daumier –
 Vincent van Gogh –
 Käthe Kollwitz –
 Max Beckmann –
 Jean Dubuffet –
 Egon Schiele –
 Arshile Gorky –
 Paul Klee –
 Oscar Kokoschka –
 Alphonse Mucha –
 Gustave Doré (1832–1883)
 Edward Linley Sambourne (1844–1910) –
 The Rhodes Colossus (1892) –
 M. C. Escher (1898–1972) –
 Metamorphosis I (1937) –
 Metamorphosis II (1940) –
 Reptiles (1943) –
 Drawing Hands (1948) –
 Relativity (1953) –
 Ascending and Descending (1960) –
 Waterfall (1961) –
 Metamorphosis III (1968) –
 André Masson (1896–1987) –
 Jules Pascin (1885–1930) –
 Pablo Picasso (1881–1973) –
 Don Quixote (1955) –
 Jorge Melício (born 1957) –
 Erotic Feelings (series) –
 Drawings by Douglas Hamilton –

See also 
 Outline of painting
 Outline of sculpture

References

External links 

Drawing and drawings
Drawing and drawings